The 1957 World Ninepin Bowling Classic Championships was the third edition of the championships and was held in Vienna, Austria, from 9 to 14 June 1957.

In the men's competition the title was won by Yugoslavia in the team competition and by Ion Micoroiu (Romania) in the individual event. In the women's competition the title was won by Austria in the team competition and by Gertrude Schmidka (Austria) in the individual event.
Hungary and Romania entered its first championship.

Participating teams

Men

Women

Results

Men - team 
The competition was played with 200 throws mixed (100 full, 100 clean). Teams were composed of 6 competitors and the scores were added up.

|}

Women - team 
The competition was played with 100 throws mixed (50 full, 50 clean). Teams were composed of 6 competitors and the scores were added up.

|}

Men - individual

Women - individual

Medal summary

Medal table

Men

Women

References 
 WC Archive on KZS
 WC History on WNBA NBC

World Ninepin Bowling Classic Championships
1957 in bowling
1957 in Austrian sport
International sports competitions hosted by Austria
Sports competitions in Vienna